Sekhar Kammula (born 4 February 1972) is an Indian film director, screenwriter and producer who works in Telugu cinema. He has garnered two Filmfare Awards South, and six state Nandi Awards for his directional works. Sekhar Kammula was among the director's delegation to represent South Indian Cinema at the 2011 Cannes Film Festival.

A Master of Science and Master of Fine Arts  holder from Rutgers University  and Howard University  respectively,  Sekhar Kammula made his directorial debut with the independent film Dollar Dreams (2000), which won him the National Film Award for Best First film of a director. The film was also screened at the International Film Festival of India. Kammula went onto direct critically and commercially successful Telugu films Anand (2004), Godavari (2006), Happy Days (2007), Leader (2010), Fidaa (2017), and Love Story (2021).

Early life and education
Sekhar Kammula was born in Eluru, Andhra Pradesh and brought up in Hyderabad, Telangana. He graduated in Mechanical Engineering from Chaitanya Bharathi Institute of Technology, and completed his Masters M.S from Rutgers University in Computer Science in the U.S. He worked in the IT industry for about 3 years and then joined a film school and got his M.F.A (Film) degree at Howard University, Washington D.C. During this time he worked on a number of films (short and feature length) in the U.S.

Film career 
Kammula made his film directorial debut with the independent film Dollar Dreams (2000), shot in both Telugu and English which was a critical success, and won him the National Film Award for Best First film of a director. The film was screened at the International Film Festival of India.

His second film, Anand (2004) was a commercial success and was among highest grossing Telugu films of that year. His next film, Godavari, was praised by critics and was a commercial success.

In 2007, his directed Happy Days which depicted the regular college life of engineering students. The film was very successful, especially among the urban youth of then Andhra Pradesh. The film was later remade in Tamil and Kannada languages. He then directed political film Leader which released in 2010 to positive reviews. Rediff.com noted that "If anything, the film is a wish-list of what one would like to see in the arena of politics, which Sekhar should be lauded for even trying."

In 2012, Kammula written, produced and directed Life Is Beautiful, his first production venture. The film had a positive reception from critics and audience. Firstpost called the film a revamped version of Happy Days (2007) and noted similarities between the characters written by Kammula in both the films. Later in 2014, he directed Anaamika, a Telugu remake of 2012 Hindi film Kahaani in which Nayantara played Vidya Balan's character.

In 2017, his romantic comedy film Fidaa, starring Varun Tej and Sai Pallavi, grossed over 90 crore worldwide at the box office. In 2021, Kammula's Telugu film, Love Story, starring Naga Chaitanya and Sai Pallavi was released to mostly positive reviews.

Film directorial style 
Kammula's films often focuses on the relationship between men and women in their routine life circumstances filled with both happiness and hardships. Sankeertana Varma of Film Companion calls film portrayal of his female characters as somewhat "special." She writes that they aren't particular "strong women" but they are real. Varma adds that though his female characters display their egos and throw tantrums, they are unbreakable and refuse to fit in the typical societal norms expected from a normal woman. Kammula has also appreciated the work of other directors including the recent Telugu hit Vaarasudu.

Filmography

 Cameo appearances 
 Dollar Dreams (1999)
Anand (2004) as Auto driver
 Godavari (2006) as Kotigadu, a stray dog (voice role)
 Avakai Biryani (2008) as Hotel Customer
 Mukunda (2014) as Bus traveller

Awards and nominations

References

External links

http://www.amigoscreations.com/

21st-century Indian film directors
Telugu film directors
Living people
1974 births
Howard University alumni
Rutgers University alumni
Screenwriters from Hyderabad, India
Filmfare Awards South winners
Nandi Award winners
Film directors from Hyderabad, India
Telugu screenwriters
Telugu film producers
Film producers from Hyderabad, India
Director whose film won the Best Debut Feature Film National Film Award
Producers who won the Best Debut Feature Film of a Director National Film Award
Zee Cine Awards Telugu winners
CineMAA Awards winners
People from Eluru